Smimou is a town in Essaouira Province, Marrakesh-Safi, Morocco. According to the 2004 census it has a population of 2,675.

References

Populated places in Essaouira Province